The 46th Primetime Emmy Awards were held on Sunday, September 11, 1994. The ceremony was hosted by Patricia Richardson and Ellen DeGeneres. It was broadcast on ABC. Comedy Central received its first major nomination at this ceremony.

For its first season, the Cheers spin-off Frasier won Outstanding Comedy Series and four total major awards. For the second straight year Picket Fences won Outstanding Drama Series, it too won four major awards on the night, but the more impressive drama series was newcomer NYPD Blue, which took home three major awards.

NYPD Blue came into the ceremony with 19 major nominations. This broke Hill Street Blues record for most nominations by a drama or comedy series of 16 set in 1982, and put it in second place all time behind Roots which gained 21 major nominations in 1977. NYPD Blue set another milestone when it received every nomination for Outstanding Writing in a Drama Series, this marked only the ninth time that a show had received every nomination in a category. This feat has not been accomplished since.

The television film And the Band Played On also made Emmy history. It set a new record when it received nine major nominations, the most ever for a television movie. The record was maintained for twenty years, until The Normal Heart received nine major nominations in 2014. Both films won the top prize, but each lost all six of their acting nominations, directing, and writing to other projects.

Winners and nominees

Programs

Acting

Lead performances

Supporting performances

Guest performances

Directing

Writing

Most major nominations
By network 
 CBS – 42
 NBC – 39
 ABC – 36
 HBO – 24

By program
 NYPD Blue (ABC) – 17
 Seinfeld (NBC) – 10
 And the Band Played On (HBO) / Picket Fences (CBS) – 9
 Frasier (NBC) – 7
 Mad About You (NBC) – 6

Most major awards
By network 
 CBS – 13
 ABC / NBC – 6
 HBO – 4

By program
 Frasier (NBC) / Picket Fences (CBS) – 4
 David's Mother (CBS) / NYPD Blue (ABC) – 3

Notes

References

External links
 Emmys.com list of 1994 Nominees & Winners
 

046
Primetime Emmy Awards
1994 in California
September 1994 events in the United States
Events in Pasadena, California
20th century in Pasadena, California